Juan de la Cerda y Silva, 4th Duke of Medinaceli (c. 1514 – 1575), Grandee of Spain,  was a Spanish nobleman.

He was the son of Don Juan de la Cerda, 2nd Duke of Medinaceli, by second wife María de Silva. In 1552 Juan de la Cerda inherited the titles from his older half-brother Gastón de la Cerda y Portugal.

Both half brothers, the 3rd, Gaston,  and the 4th Duke, Juan II, are widely reported in many places and articles as being born "out of marriage" from different women and being "legitimated" males by the Crown as legal successors to their father, the second duke Juan I, also, apparently, a legitimated bastard, however.

In 1557, King Philip II of Spain appointed him Viceroy of Sicily, a position he held until 1564. During that time he besieged with a fleet the North-African harbor of Tripoli, now in Libya, dealing with Dragut, a Turkish privateer and Ottoman admiral.  The force, including ships from Spain, Genoa, Tuscany, the Knights of Malta and the Papal States, was however nearly destroyed in the Battle of Djerba.

In 1567 he was appointed Viceroy of Navarre supposedly staying there till 1572, but it seems that towards the end of 1570,  he became head of the household of Queen Anna of Austria, position he held until his death in 1575.

In the spring of 1572 Philip II sent Medinaceli to the Netherlands as governor. According to Henry Kamen, Medinaceli reported to the king that “Excessive rigour, the misconduct of some officers and soldiers, and the Tenth Penny, are the cause of all the ills, and not heresy or rebellion.” [...] One of the governor’s officers reported that in the Netherlands “the name of the house of Alba” was held in abhorrence. Medinaceli lobbied the King for the removal of the Duke of Alba as military commander. Deciding that the views of Medinaceli and Alba were not compatible, Philip II removed both and replaced them with Requesens.

Descendants
On 7 April 1541, at Ocaña, Juan de la Cerda married  Joana Manuel, daughter of Sancho de Noronha, 2nd Count of Faro with whom he had seven children.

By Joana Manuel de Portugal:
 María de la Cerda (c. 1542 – c.1575), who married Antonio d’Aragona, 4th Duke of Montalto
 Juan de la Cerda, 5th Duke of Medinaceli, (1544 - duke 1575–1594).
 Gastón de la Cerda y Silva (c. 1546 – c.1562) who was captured and died as a prisoner in Constantinople
 Sancho de la Cerda y Portugal, 1st Marquis of la Laguna de Camero Viejo (c. 1550 – 1626)
 Angela de la Cerda, who married Pier Giulio de Luna, 2nd Duke of Bivona
 Blanca de la Cerda, 1st Marchioness of Rifes, who married Fernando de Silva, 6th Count of Cifuentes
 Catalina de la Cerda, who married Francisco Gómez de Sandoval, 1st Duke of Lerma; their granddaughter Luisa de Guzman became Queen of Portugal (ancestor of all subsequent monarchs), and their great-granddaughter was Catherine of Braganza, an English queen consort.

References

Sources

1514 births
1575 deaths
Dukes of Medinaceli
Viceroys of Navarre
Marquesses of Cogolludo
Counts of Puerto de Santa María
Juan 04
Knights of Santiago
Grandees of Spain